This is a list of people executed in Tennessee. Until 1913, there were no records of the numbers or names of the people who were executed.

1916–1960

1976–present

See also 
 Capital punishment in Tennessee
 Capital punishment in the United States

References 

 TN Executions. Tennessee Department of Correction. Retrieved on 2020-12-30.
 'I did not kill them' condemned man says. The Tennessean, February 3, 2009.  Retrieved on 2009-02-04.
 'I commend my life into your hands' Tenn. inmate sings hymns as execution is carried out. Fox 17 Nashville. Retrieved on 2019-05-17.

 
Tennessee
People executed